Stenomesson is a genus of bulbous plants in the family Amaryllidaceae. All the species are native to western South America (Colombia, Ecuador, Peru and northern Chile).

Species
, Plants of the World Online accepted the following species:
Stenomesson aurantiacum (Kunth) Herb. - Colombia, Ecuador, Peru
Stenomesson breviflorum Herb. - Peru (Junín, Lima)
Stenomesson campanulatum Alan Meerow - Peru (Cajamarca, La Libertad)
Stenomesson chilense Ravenna - Chile (Tarapacá)
Stenomesson chloranthum Meerow & van der Werff - Peru (Amazonas)
Stenomesson ecuadorense Meerow, Oleas & L.Jost
Stenomesson flavum (Ruiz & Pav.) Herb. - Peru (Cajamarca, Lima, La Libertad, Pasco)
Stenomesson gasteroides Ravenna	- Peru
Stenomesson leucanthum (Ravenna) Meerow & van der Werff - Peru (Cajamarca, La Libertad)
Stenomesson miniatum (Herb.) Ravenna - Peru (Cajamarca, Apurimac, Cusco), Bolivia (La Paz)
Stenomesson moldenkei Traub - Peru (Lima)
Stenomesson parvulum Ravenna - Peru (Cajamarca])
Stenomesson pauciflorum (Lindl. ex Hook.) Herb. - Peru (Lima)
Stenomesson pearcei Baker - Peru (Junín, Puno, Cusco), Bolivia (La Paz)
Stenomesson rupense Ravenna - Peru
Stenomesson tubiflorum (Meerow) Meerow
Stenomesson vitellinum Lindl. - Peru (Lima)
Stenomesson weberbaueri (Vargas) Ravenna - Peru (Cajamarca])

Formerly included
Numerous names have been coined using the name Stenomesson referring to species now regarded as better suited to other genera (Clinanthus, Eucrosia, Ismene and Urceolina).

References

Flora of South America
Amaryllidoideae
Amaryllidaceae genera